Travesía (English: Crossing) is a studio album recorded by Puerto Rican salsa performer Víctor Manuelle, It was released by Sony Music Latin on March 2, 2004 (see 2004 in music). This album became his second number-one set on the Billboard Top Latin Albums.

Track listing
The track listing from Billboard.

Chart performance

Sales and certifications

See also
List of number-one Billboard Top Latin Albums of 2004
List of number-one Billboard Tropical Albums from the 2000s

References

2004 albums
Víctor Manuelle albums
Spanish-language albums
Sony Discos albums
Albums produced by Emilio Estefan